Ann(e) Campbell may refer to:

Anne Campbell (politician) (born 1940), British MP
Anne Campbell (academic) (1951–2017), British academic
Anne Campbell (conductor) (1912–2011), Canadian choir conductor
Ann Campbell (sailor) in Clifford Day Mallory Cup

See also
Annie Campbell, fictional character
Anna Campbell (1991–2018), British-Kurdish soldier